Yota Space is a non-profit international digital art festival organized by Yota in St. Petersburg since 2010.

The Concept 
Yota Space is an international festival in St. Petersburg, Russia. The festival is dedicated to contemporary digital and interactive art. Yota Space is the space of the future, an exciting creative environment, a platform for sharing experiences and knowledge. The festival is conceived as a space of creative growth and exchange of experience, a major component of the project is an educational program.

Yota Space 2010 
The first Yota Space festival was held in St. Petersburg December 5–19, 2010 in a giant former Stalin-era Frunzenskiy department store (Moskovsky Prospect, 60). The festival Grand Opening show was featured with a concert involving Hot Chip, Masters of Skweee, D-Pulse, SCSI-9, etc. The festival received wide coverage in Russian and international press. The Financial Times named Yota Space "The largest digital arts festival in Europe".

Artists 
 onedotzero
 United Visual Artists
 Jason Bruges Studio
 Brian Eno
 MSA Visuals
 Chris Levine 
 Hellicar + Lewis
 AntiVJ
 Quayola 
 Cassette Playa
 Kin Design
 onedotzero_industries
 Lab212
 Joon Y Moon
 Max Hattler
 Universal Everything
 Musion
 OMG Sounds Productions
 AV:in
 Russian Visual Artists

Yota Space 2012 
In Spring 2012 St. Petersburg will host Yota Space International Digital Art again. During six weeks the public will be immersed in the interactive space, and transform themselves and their perceptions with new experiences and emotions. As for the first time, the festival will be filled with interactive installations, kinetic and media sculptures, 3D-projections, other digital art masterpieces, audio-visual performances, lectures and concerts.

Artists 
Among the participants of Yota Space 2012 are Djeff (France), LAb[au] (Belgium), MSA Visuals (UK), Danniel Hirschman (Germany), Nordic Creative (Norway), Studio Roosergaarde (Netherlands), Zigelbaum + Coelho (USA/Brazil), Jonas Heuer (Germany), Martin Richardson & Chris Levine (UK), Lawrence Malstaf (Belgium), Felix Luque Sanchez (Spain), John Miserendino, Charles Carcopino (Italy), Kurt Hentschläger (Austria / USA), Motoi Ishibashi & Daite Manabe (Japan), Russian Visuals Artists (Russia) and many others.

Curatorial Board 
Yota Space Festival Curatorial Board: 
 Alexandra Sanchez-Perez (Yota).
 Shane RJ Walter (onedotzero, Creative Director)
 Ilya Oskolkov-Tsenzieper (Strelka Institute, Russia, Director)
 Olga Sviblova (Moscow Multimedia Art Museum, Director)

References

External links 
 Yota Space Official Website
 Yota Space on Vimeo
 Yota Space on YouTube
 Yota Official Website
 onedotzero project page

Arts events
Culture in Saint Petersburg
Russian art
Tourist attractions in Saint Petersburg